Top of the World is a 1997 film directed by Sidney J. Furie and starring Peter Weller, Dennis Hopper and Tia Carrere. It also features David Alan Grier, Cary-Hiroyuki Tagawa, Peter Coyote and Joe Pantoliano. The plot is set in Las Vegas.

Plot
In Las Vegas for a quickie divorce, a just-paroled ex-cop and his wife wander into the Cowboy Country Casino, run by the shady Charles Atlas. They win big, right as the casino is being robbed. The police believe their big win was a staged diversion and the two of them become suspects. Over the course of the evening and next morning, the two attempt to escape the surrounded casino and prove their innocence, as well as save their marriage.

Cast
 Peter Weller as Ray Mercer
 Dennis Hopper as Charlie Atlas
 Tia Carrere as Rebecca Mercer
 David Alan Grier as Detective Augustus
 Cary-Hiroyuki Tagawa as Captain Hefter
 Gavan O'Herlihy as Lieutenant Logan
 Michael DeLano as Lieutenant De Rosa
 Joe Pantoliano as Vince Castor
 Martin Kove as Carl
 Kevin Bernhardt as Dean
 Dell Yount as Mac
 Derek Anunciation as Fredo
 Alexander Mervin as Benny
 Eddie Mekka as Joe Burns
 Ed Lauter as Mel Ridgefield
 Peter Coyote as Tony "The Butcher" Borghesi
 Paul Vroom as Chick
 Eric James as Mick
 Joseph J. Tomaska as Rick
 Peter Vent as Dick
 Larry Manetti as Morgan
 Sly Smith as Fipps
 Frank Patton III as Franco
 Rusty Meyers as Sergeant Daniels
 Julie McCullough as Ginger
 Lati Grobman as Cindy
 Paul Herman as The Valet

External links 
 
 

1997 films
American crime thriller films
1990s English-language films
American psychological thriller films
Nu Image films
Films directed by Sidney J. Furie
Films set in the Las Vegas Valley
Films scored by Robert O. Ragland
1997 crime thriller films
1990s psychological thriller films
Films produced by Elie Samaha
1990s American films